The 2008 World Outdoor Bowls Championship women's pairs was held at the Burnside Bowling Club in Christchurch, New Zealand, from 12 to 24 January 2008.

Jo Edwards and Val Smith  won the women's pairs gold medal.

Section tables

Section A

Section B

Finals

Results

References

Bowls
Wom
World